In Etruscan mythology and religion, Selvans is god of the woodlands and boundaries, including sacred boundaries.  He is possibly cognate with Roman Silvanus. As the god of boundaries, he is known by the epithet tularias as stated by a dedication of a statue to the god. His name is 10th on the list of 16 gods on the outer rim of the Piacenza Liver (a bronze model of a sheep’s liver used as a reference or teaching tool for divination). Votive inscriptions from the liver show that he was a popular god in Etruria. 

Only one certain representation of Selvans has been found, alongside a statue of Culśanś. He is portrayed as a naked youth wearing a hide of a bear’s cap and high boots. This contrasts from the Roman Silvanus, who is usually shown as a bearded man.

See also
 Etruscan civilization 
Etruscan religion
Culśanś

References

Etruscan gods
Etruscan religion
Nature gods